The MLW RS-23 was a  diesel-electric locomotive built by Montreal Locomotive Works between August 1959 and September 1960. Production totaled 40 locomotives.

The largest fleet of these locomotives was operated by Canadian Pacific Railway, which classed them DRS-10c in that company's locomotive classification system.

Original owners

See also 
 List of MLW diesel locomotives

References

B-B locomotives
RS-23
Railway locomotives introduced in 1959
Diesel-electric locomotives of Canada
Standard gauge locomotives of Canada